Corymbia collina, commonly known as the silver-leaved bloodwood, is a species of tree that is endemic to Western Australia. It has thin patchy rough bark on some or all of the trunk, smooth white to pale grey bark above, lance-shaped to curved adult leaves, flower buds in groups of seven, creamy white flowers and barrel-shaped fruit.

Description
It has rough, patchy, fibrous to flaky, tessellated bark on part or all of the trunk, smooth white or cream-coloured to pale grey bark above. Flowering occurs from April to June and the flowers are creamy white.

Taxonomy and naming
The name Eucalyptus collina first appeared in the Western Mail newspaper on 2 June 1906 in an article written by William Vincent Fitzgerald. The first formal description of the species was published in 1923 by Joseph Maiden in his book, A Critical Revision of the genus Eucalyptus, from an unpublished description by Fitzgerald.<ref name="Maiden">{{cite book |last1=Maiden |first1=Joseph |title=A Critical Revision of the genus "Eucalyptus (Volume 6) |date=1923 |publisher=New South Wales Government Printer |location=Sydney |pages=419–420 |url=https://www.biodiversitylibrary.org/item/123318#page/583/mode/1up |access-date=27 July 2019}}</ref> In 1995, Ken Hill and Lawrie Johnson changed the name to Corymbia collina''.

Distribution and habitat
The silver-leaved bloodwood grows on rocky ranges, tablelands and slopes in the Wunaamin Miliwundi Ranges and Bungle Bungle Range areas in the Kimberley region of Western Australia.

See also
 List of Corymbia species

References

collina
Myrtales of Australia
Rosids of Western Australia
Plants described in 1923